Nicotine Records is an indie label formed in 1999. It has released punk, power pop, garage rock, hard rock and glam music, and its roster has included artists such as False Alarm, The Fleshtones, Gaza Strippers, Garrett Uhlenbrock ( Skinny Bones), Walter Lure and Lime Spiders.

Artists

External links
 
All Music Guide - 'Album' section - Urban Waste

Independent record labels
Record labels established in 1999
Punk record labels